The Siberian Elm cultivar Ulmus pumila 'Harbin' is an older Manchurian selection superseded in the United States by 'Dropmore'.

Description
'Harbin' is a rounded or umbrella-headed tree growing to between 9 and 12 m in height, with fine branchlets bearing narrow leaves 5 cm long.

Pests and diseases
See under Ulmus pumila.

Cultivation
'Harbin' is known to be hardy in the American prairies.

References

Siberian elm cultivar
Ulmus articles missing images
Ulmus